Witold Lutosławski wrote his Symphony No. 3 in 1973–1983. The Chicago Symphony Orchestra, conducted by Georg Solti, gave the world premiere on 29 September 1983. 

The work is dedicated to Solti and the Chicago Symphony Orchestra. It was awarded the Nagroda Solidarności in 1984 and selected for the first Grawemeyer Award for Music Composition in 1985.

Instrumentation
The Symphony calls for a large orchestra, consisting of:
Woodwind:  3 flutes (two doubling piccolo), 3 oboes (third doubling cor anglais), 3 clarinets (one doubling E-flat clarinet, another doubling bass clarinet), 3 bassoons (third doubling contrabassoon)
Brass: 4 horns, 4 trumpets, 4 trombones, tuba
Percussion:
timpani
4 additional percussionists playing:  xylophone, glockenspiel, marimba, vibraphone (without motor), bells, five tom-toms, two bongos, bass drum, side drum, tenor drum, three cymbals (small, medium and large), tam-tams (hign and low) and tambourine
Keyboards: celesta, piano (four hands)
Strings: 2 harps, first and second violins, violas, cellos and basses

Analysis

Many passages in the Symphony no. 3 employ Lutosławski's by-then well developed technique which he called "limited aleatorism", in which the individual players in the orchestra are each asked to play their phrase or repeated fragment in their own time — rhythmically independent from the other musicians.  During these passages very little synchronisation is specified: events that are coordinated include the simultaneous entrances of groups of instruments, the abrupt end of some episodes, and some transitions to new sections.  By this method the composer retains control of the symphony's architecture and the realisation of the performance, while simultaneously creating complex and somewhat unpredictable polyphony.

At the beginning of the illustrated page from the score, for instance, the woodwinds and brass (notated at the top of the page) are playing short repeated passages.  The composer specifies completely the music for each player, leaving the interpretation to the individuals: only the co-ordination between the parts is unspecified.  The strings (notated at the bottom of the page) join the texture by sections: first the violins, then the violas, the cellos and lastly the basses, all playing rapid repeating figures.  The string players do not coordinate their playing (even within sections) except for their entries.  These entries are indicated by the conductor, as instructed by the down-arrows above the string parts.

Other parts of the symphony (the very beginning and the very end, for example) call for rhythmic synchronization of the orchestra, and are notated more traditionally.

Recordings

The first recording was awarded the Grammophone Contemporary Award 1986 and the Koussevitzky Prix Mondial du Disque (Paris 1986).

References
 Witold Lutosławski: Symphony No. 3 (3.Symfonia) – information page for the work from the publisher, Chester Novello (accessed 2007-03-31)
 Lutosławski, Witold.  Symphony no. 3 (score).  London:  Chester Music, 1990.  

3
1983 compositions
Lutoslawski 3
Music commissioned by the Chicago Symphony Orchestra